Liwale is one of the six districts of the Lindi Region of Tanzania. It is the largest district in Lindi and one of the largest in districts in Tanzania. It is bordered to the north by the Pwani Region, to the east by the Kilwa District, to the south by the Ruangwa District and to the west by the Morogoro Region. Most of Liwale district is within the Nyerere National Park.

According to the 2002 Tanzania National Census, the population of the Liwale District was 75,546.

In April 2013, there was rioting in Liwale over the levels of payments made for cashew nuts. Police used tear gas and a helicopter to control the riots. Approximately 20 houses were burnt down.

Wards

The Liwale District is administratively divided into 20 wards:

 Barikiwa
 Kiangara
 Kibutuka
 Kimambi
 Liwale 'B'
 Liwale Mjini
 Makata
 Mangirikiti
 Mbaya
 Mihumo
 Mirui
 Mkutano (English meaning: meeting)
 Mlembwe
 Mpigamiti
 Nangano
 Ngongowele
 Likongowele
 Nangando
 Lilombe
 Kichonda

References

Districts of Lindi Region